Võrsna is a village in Saaremaa Parish, Saare County, Estonia, on the island of Saaremaa. As of 2011 Census, the settlement's population was 6.

Journalist and writer Aleksander Antson (1899–1945) was born in Võrsna.

References

Villages in Saare County